Adolf Kertész (15 March 1892 – November 1920; nicknamed "Kertész III") was a Hungarian footballer who played as a half back at both the professional level for MTK Budapest (winning the Hungarian League championship four times and the Hungarian Cup once) and the international level for the Hungary national football team. He was Jewish.

Career
Kertész played left midfielder in club football for MTK Budapest between 1909 and 1920. He scored 19 goals in 148 league matches. He won the Hungarian League championship with MTK four times (1913–14, 1916–17, 1917–18, and 1919–20). He was a member of the side that won the 1909–10 Hungarian Cup.

Kertész also represented Hungary at international level, earning 11 caps between 1911 and 1920.

Personal life
Kertész, who was Jewish, was born in Kisfalud, Austria-Hungary. He had two older brothers who were also footballers - Vilmos and Gyula.

Kertész died in a car accident in Saarbrücken, Germany, where he had settled, in November 1920, aged 28.

See also
List of Jewish footballers

References

External links
 Jews In Sports
 Inscription and photo of his tombstone in the Saarbrücken Jewish Cemetery

1892 births
1920 deaths
People from Fejér County
Sportspeople from Saarbrücken
Footballers from Budapest
Hungarian footballers
Hungary international footballers
MTK Budapest FC players
Jewish footballers
Hungarian Jews
Road incident deaths in Hungary
Association football defenders
Road incident deaths in Germany